Ramot HaShavim (lit. Heights of the Returnees) is a Jewish village in central Israel. Located between Hod HaSharon and Ra'anana and covering around 2,300 dunams, it falls under the jurisdiction of Drom HaSharon Regional Council.

History
Ramot HaShavim was established as a moshav in 1933 by German immigrants of the Fifth Aliyah. In 1951 it became an independent local council, but as part of local government reforms in 2003 it reverted to village status under the jurisdiction of a regional council.

Gallery

References

External links
Official website 

Former moshavim
Former local councils in Israel
Villages in Israel
Populated places established in 1933
Populated places in Central District (Israel)
1933 establishments in Mandatory Palestine
German-Jewish culture in Israel